Erica thomensis is a plant belonging to the genus Erica and is native to São Tomé.

References  

 

thomensis
Flora of São Tomé Island
Plants described in 1999